Chengbei Subdistrict is a subdistrict in the center of Changping District, Beijing, China. It shares border with Shisanling Town in its north, Nanshao Town in its east, Chengnan Subdistrict and Machikou Town in its south, and Chengnan Subdistrict in its west. It was home to 228,561 residents as of 2020.

The subdistrict's name literally translates to "City North", which is referring to its location north of the old city gate.

History

Administrative divisions 

In the year 2021, there were 51 subdivisions within Chengbei Subdistrict, 46 of them were communities, and 5 were villages:

Gallery

See also 

 List of township-level divisions of Beijing

References 

Changping District
Subdistricts of Beijing